Symonette is a surname. Notable people with the surname include:

Brent Symonette (born 1954), Bahamian businessman
Craig Symonette (born 1951), Bahamian sailor
Georgianna Kathleen Symonette (1902–1965), Bahamian suffragist
Josh Symonette (born 1978), American football player
Robert Symonette (1925–1998), Bahamian sailor, businessman and politician
Roland Theodore Symonette (1898–1980), Bahamian politician